Keith Edward Rigg  (21 May 1906 – 28 February 1995) was an Australian cricketer who played in eight Test matches from 1931 to 1937. His cousin, Colin McDonald, also played for Victoria and Australia. He was educated at Wesley College, Melbourne.

From 1933 to 1937, Rigg had an endorsement deal with the Alexander Patent Racket Company in Launceston, Tasmania, to produce a range of 'Keith Rigg' cricket bats.

He was appointed Member of the Order of the British Empire (MBE) in the 1971 Birthday Honours for services to industry and sport.

References

External links

1906 births
1995 deaths
Australia Test cricketers
Victoria cricketers
Melbourne Cricket Club cricketers
People educated at Wesley College (Victoria)
Australian cricketers
Cricketers from Melbourne
Australian Members of the Order of the British Empire
People from Malvern, Victoria